TWW may refer to:

 The Legend of Zelda: The Wind Waker, an action-adventure game developed and published by Nintendo for the GameCube
 Television Wales and the West, the British Independent Television contractor serving South Wales and West of England from 1956–68
 TheWolfWeb, an unofficial message board for North Carolina State University
 Thomas Woodrow Wilson (1856–1924), an American politician and academic who served as the 28th president of the United States from 1913 to 1921
 Transcom WorldWide, a customer relationship management and debt collection company based in Europe
 Transformers: The War Within, a series of comic book mini-series written by Simon Furman
 Tsuen Wan West station, Hong Kong; MTR station code TWW
 The West Wing, an American serial political drama television series